Dharampal Singh Malik (born 13 May 1943) in a small village, Bidhal Tehsil Gohana, Sonipat District of Haryana. He was a member of the 8th Lok Sabha (1984–1989), representing the Sonipat (Lok Sabha constituency). Later, he was elected to the 10th Lok Sabha (1991–1996). He was the President of the Haryana Pradesh Congress Committee (1992–97). He also became a Member of legislative assembly from Gohana (2005–2008). He completed his Bachelor of Arts & Bachelor of Laws (BA, LLB) from the University of Delhi, and he also studied from DB High School Bhainswal Kalan, Sonipat, Arya College, Panipat.

Birth, family and education
Dharampal Singh Malik has a son Vishal Malik who is Indian Film Actor and two daughters Shakti Ahlawat and Anita Malik who is lecturer in Haryana Govt School Sonipat, His Wife is Sudha Malik who is Former Member, Haryana Public Service Commission and Chairperson Haryana Janhit Congress (woman Cell). He belongs to an Arya Samaji family.

He belongs to an agriculturist family. His father name is Ch. Amir Singh Malik and his mother name is Shrimati Chotto Devi. He took admission in district board primary school, Bidhal in April 1947 as the youngest student of his class. Then in 3rd standard he joined district board middle school Bhainswal Kalan, Tehsil Gohana, Sonipat and passed out his 10th standard NDA examination but could not be selected for interview. Then he came back and took admission in 11th standard in Arya College, Panipat and cleared Faculty of Arts (F.A) in 1961. Then he did his Bachelor of Arts from the same college in 1963. Later, he took admission in University of Delhi in July 1964. After that he completed his Law from Delhi in 1966. Then he did practice under Chaudhary Lahri Singh for 1 year. Former Minister, Joined Punjab and Haryana and Former Member of Parliament Lok Sabha from Rohtak after that he got advocate licence from Punjab and Haryana High Court in Dec 1966 and then he started his legal Practice in 1967.

He started his career by becoming the Supreme Counsellor, University of Delhi in 1964. After that he became the Member of Executive Committee, Kanya Gurukul, Khanpur Kalan and Gurukul Bhainswal Kalan Sonipat since 1968–84, then he was elected Delegate to IFFCO in 1972. He became the Vice President of Central Cooperative Bank Sonipat in 1973. Also, he got selected as the Director of Marketing Cooperative Society, Gohana in 1974, then he founded the Arya High School, Gohana in 1975. He contested Haryana Assembly election from Gohana on Indian National Congress ticket in 1977, and also became the Member of Managing Committee, All India Jat Heroes' Memorial College, Rohtak in 1983. After that he got Elected to 8th Lok Sabha in 1984 by defeating Chaudhary Devi Lal. He became the Member of Committee Subordinate Legislation, Lok Sabha in 1985, also become Chairman of Haryana State Congress MPs in Parliament in 1985, and also member of Estimates Committee, Lok Sabha, in 1987. He had been the President of DCC Sonipat in 1989, then again re-elected to 10th Lok Sabha in 1991, then became Member of Estimates Committee, Lok Sabha 1992 He also became the President of Haryana Pradesh Congress Committee in 1992, Member of Committee Subordinate Legislation, Lok Sabha in 1994, Member of the Legislative Assembly in 2005. In 2012, he became the Chairman of Joint Committee i.e., Bharatiya Janata Party and Haryana Janhit Congress (BL).

Brief resume

References

External links

 http://www.tribuneindia.com/2004/20040519/ncr1.htm – Dharampal Singh Malik

Living people
Haryana MLAs 2005–2009
Indian National Congress politicians
Haryana Janhit Congress politicians
People from Sonipat
1943 births
Lok Sabha members from Haryana
India MPs 1984–1989
India MPs 1991–1996